El Culpable Soy Yo (The Guilty I Am) is the 12th studio album recorded by Mexican singer-songwriter Cristian Castro, It was released by Universal Music Latino on April 28, 2009. The album was produced by A.B. Quintanilla. The 5th song on the album features his grandmother Socorro Castro mother of Verónica Castro. At the Premio Lo Nuestro 2010 awards, the album was nominated Pop Album of the Year losing to La Quinta Estación's Sin Frenos.

Track listing

Chart positions

References

2009 albums
Cristian Castro albums
Spanish-language albums
Albums produced by A.B. Quintanilla
Universal Music Latino albums